Marcus Jastrow (June 5, 1829 – October 13, 1903) was a German-born American Talmudic scholar, most famously known for his authorship of the popular and comprehensive Dictionary of the Targumim, Talmud Babli, Talmud Yerushalmi and Midrashic Literature. He was also a progressive, early reformist rabbi.

Jastrow was born in Rogasen in the Grand Duchy of Posen, Prussia. After receiving rabbinical ordination, Ph.D., and Doctorate of Letters (D.Litt.), he became the rabbi of the then Orthodox Congregation Rodeph Shalom in Philadelphia, Pennsylvania, in 1866, at the age of thirty-seven. In 1886, he began publishing his magnum opus, A Dictionary of the Targumim, Talmud Babli, Talmud Yerushalmi and Midrashic Literature, in pamphlet form. It was finally completed and published in two-volume form in 1903, and has since become a popular resource for students of the Talmud. In the preface to this work, Jastrow sharply criticized those linguistic and etymological scholars who claimed that obscure terms in Talmudic literature are primarily derived from Greek. Jastrow held that Greek influence on Talmudic Aramaic was minimal, and that most obscure terms could be much more simply traced to Hebrew origins. Jastrow was also responsible for most Talmud-related articles in the Jewish Encyclopedia.

He was the father of Joseph Jastrow, Morris Jastrow Jr., Alice Jastrow, Annie Jastrow and Nellie Jastrow. Elisabeth Jastrow, the classical archaeologist, was his niece.

Biography
Marcus Jastrow was the fifth child of Abraham Jastrow and Yetta (Henrietta) Rolle. Until 1840 he was privately educated. In 1844 he entered the third-year class of the Friedrich Wilhelm Gymnasium at Posen, graduating in 1852. From there he went to Halle, where he graduated in 1855, receiving the degree of doctor of philosophy. In the meantime he continued his Jewish studies and in 1853, at the age of 24, he received his rabbinical ordination from Rabbi Moses Feilchenfeld in Rogasen and later, in 1857, from Rabbi Wolf Landau in Dresden. Jastrow taught briefly at Orthodox Jewish schools in Berlin, first at a school by Dr. David Rosen then at Michael Sachs' school.

Joins in Polish revolution
In 1858, recommended by Heinrich Graetz, Jastrow moved again as rabbi to the leading Orthodox congregation in Warsaw, the so-called German synagogue on Daniłowiczowska Street, and threw himself into the study of the Polish language and of Polish conditions. By February 27, 1861, national feeling had risen so high in Poland that the government called out the military; five victims fell in the Krakowskie Przedmieście, Warsaw, and their burial and the memorial service were turned into patriotic demonstrations, in which, for the first time, "the Old Testament Brethren" of the Poles participated as a community. Though it was the Sabbath, three rabbis, including Jastrow, joined the funeral cortège; at the memorial service in his synagogue, also on a Sabbath, Jastrow preached his first Polish sermon, which aroused such great enthusiasm that on Sunday his auditors reassembled and took it down at his dictation. Circumventing the censor, they distributed ten thousand manuscript copies within a week.

Although it was controversial at the time, delivering a sermon in Polish does not violate any Orthodox Jewish restriction. (Neither does following a funeral procession on foot on the Sabbath.) Today most Orthodox rabbis give lectures in their local vernacular.

On various pretexts the three rabbis were arrested (November 10, 1861) and incarcerated in the citadel of Warsaw. For 23 days Jastrow was kept in solitary confinement; for 72 days he shared the cell of Rabbi Meisels. His release came on February 12, 1862, when, being a Prussian subject, he was sent across the frontier. During his imprisonment he had been required to answer in writing three questions concerning the relation of the Jews to the Polish Christians in their opposition to the government.

Returns to Warsaw
Broken in health, Jastrow, with his family, spent the spring and summer of 1862 in Breslau, Berlin, and Dresden; in the autumn he accepted a call from the Jewish community in Mannheim. A few weeks later, Nov., 1862, the order for his expulsion was revoked, and gave occasion for a controversy between the congregation at Warsaw (which had continued his salary until he went to Mannheim) and that of Mannheim; at Jastrow's request the latter released him. A few months after his return to Warsaw (Jan. 1863) the revolution broke out. During its progress, and while Jastrow was traveling, his Prussian passport was canceled, and he was not permitted to return to Warsaw.

The literary results of his Polish period are: Die Lage der Juden in Polen (anonymous; Hamburg, 1859); Kazania Polskie, a volume of Polish sermons (Posen, 1863); Die Vorläufer des Polnischen Aufstandes (anonymous; Hamburg, 1864). He probably had a considerable share in the production of Beleuchtung eines Ministeriellen Gutachtens (Hamburg, 1859 [?]). In July, 1864, Jastrow accepted a call to Worms as district rabbi, and while there he produced Vier Jahrhunderte aus der Gesch. der Juden von der Zerstörung des Ersten Tempels bis zur Makkabäischen Tempelweihe (Heidelberg, 1865).

Aids organization of American Jews
In the autumn of 1866 he went to Philadelphia as rabbi of the Ashkenazi, Congregation Rodeph Shalom, with which he was connected until his death, remaining in active service until 1892 and identifying himself with the interests of the Jewish community. The problem under discussion at the time was organization, urged in the Eastern States by the Orthodox Isaac Leeser, and in the Western by the Reform Isaac Mayer Wise. It dealt with higher education, representation, and the regulation of liturgical changes, and Jastrow's personality became a factor in its solution. When, through the exertions of Leeser, the Maimonides College, the first rabbinical college in the U.S., was opened at Philadelphia, Oct., 1867, Jastrow occupied the chair of religious philosophy and Jewish history, and later also of exegesis; he was identified with the college until it closed its doors four years later. He supported the plan of organizing the Board of Delegates of Civil and Religious Rights, and, under its auspices, the American Jewish Publication Society (1873). His main activity, however, from 1867 to 1871, was directed toward combating the tendencies expressed in the resolutions of the rabbinical conferences of 1869 and 1871. His opposition to them found expression in a series of polemical articles published in The Hebrew Leader and The Jewish Times.

To the same period belongs his collaboration with the leading rabbi in Baltimore, Benjamin Szold, in the revision of the latter's prayer-book (Avodat Yisrael) and home prayer-book (Hegyon Leb), and his translation of the same prayer-books into English. (The prayer-book was later more thoroughly revised after his death.) In his own congregation his influence effected consolidation and growth; in the Jewish community he participated in the formation and reorganization of societies.

In 1876 Jastrow fell severely ill, and for some years his public activities were limited by his poor health, which necessitated a sojourn in the south of Europe. During this period of withdrawal he fully matured the plans for his great work, A Dictionary of the Targumim, the Talmud Babli and Yerushalmi, and the Midrashic Literature (London and New York, 1886–1903). When the dictionary was approaching completion in manuscript (1895), the Jewish Publication Society of America was about to begin work on its projected new translation of the Bible into English, and to Jastrow was entrusted the chief-editorship. At the time of his death the translation of more than half the books of the Bible had been revised by him. In addition to these two great undertakings, he was a member of the Publication Committee of the Jewish Publication Society from the time of its establishment, and was connected with the Jewish Encyclopedia as editor of the department of the Talmud; he took a prominent part in the proceedings of the Jewish Ministers' Association, held a seat in the central board of the Alliance Israélite Universelle in Paris, was on the committee of the Meḳiẓe Nirdamim, was one of the vice-presidents of the American Federation of Zionists, and was active in relieving the needs, material and intellectual, of the Russian immigrants.

Jastrow initially allowed his congregation to join the Reform Union of American Hebrew Congregations. After the Reform movement united around the radical "Pittsburgh Platform" in 1885, Jastrow, along with many other rabbis of the time, withdrew his congregation's membership.

In 1886 together with Rabbi Henry Pereira Mendes (founder of the Orthodox Union) he helped Rabbi Sabato Morais establish the Jewish Theological Seminary of America. It was only in 1913, ten years after Jastrow's death, that the next generation of management altered the Orthodox principles of the school, and from them emerged Conservative Judaism.

He was removed by his congregation in September 1892 in favor of the Reform ordained Dr. Henry Berkowitz. Dr. Jastrow attributed this decision to the growing popularity of radical reforms and the congregation's desire to compete for membership with the more liberal synagogues. In his farewell speech he chastised his congregation insisting that "he who does not feel himself in unison with the tenets of Israel's religion as they have been transmitted from generation to generation, [is] not justified in occupying a Jewish pulpit established for the proclamation of Jewish doctrines." Several efforts were made by him to prevent the introduction of certain reforms, including articles in the public press. In 1894, the Board felt the necessity to write him to ask him to refrain from publishing articles that might create strife in the congregation. He served as rabbi emeritus of the congregation until his death in 1903, on the Jewish festival of Shemini Atzereth.

In 1900 the University of Pennsylvania conferred upon him the doctorate of literature. He died three years later in Germantown, Philadelphia.

Besides the journals previously mentioned, articles of his appear in the Revue des Études Juives; Frankel's Monatsschrift; Berliner's Magazin für die Wissenschaft des Judenthums; Sippurim; Journal of Biblical Literature; Hebraica; Young Israel; Libanon; "Jewish Record"; Jewish Messenger; American Hebrew; Jewish Exponent; etc.

Religious views
Along with Benjamin Szold and Frederick de Sola Mendes, Marcus Jastrow was characterized by Jewish historian Jacob Rader Marcus as being on the right-wing of early American Reform. While opposed to the Pittsburgh Platform, he allowed an organ to be installed in the Rodeph Shalom Congregation.

Bibliography

M. Jastrow, "Bär Meisels, Oberrabbiner zu Warschau, Ein Lebensbild auf Historischem Hintergrunde nach Eigner Anschauung Entworfen", in Hebrew Leader, April 1-July 1, 1870
Jewish Exponent, October 16, 1903
The History of Rodeph Shalom Congregation, Philadelphia, 1802–1926. Davis, Edward, Philadelphia, 1926
"A Warning voice: Farewell sermon delivered on the occasion of his retirement". Philadelphia, [s.n.], 1892
Champion of Orthodox Judaism: A biography of the Reverend Sabato Morais, LL.D.

References

External links

Jastrow's Dictionary at Wikisource
Jastrow's Dictionary at Sefaria
Jastrow's Dictionary in PDF, volume I at etana.org; Jastrow's Dictionary in PDF, volume II at etana.org
Jastrow's Dictionary arranged for alphabetical access online at Tyndale House
The History and Future of the Jastrow Dictionary
Jastrow's Thanksgiving Sermon at Rodeph Shalom, November 26, 1866 - full view on Internet Archive
Jastrow's essays on Jewish history written while in Worms, 1865 - full view on Internet Archive
Marcus Mordechai Jastrow

1829 births
1903 deaths
American lexicographers
American Orthodox rabbis
American people of German-Jewish descent
Martin Luther University of Halle-Wittenberg alumni
People from the Grand Duchy of Posen
People from Oborniki County
German emigrants to the United States
Polish Orthodox rabbis
Talmudists
University of Pennsylvania faculty
Jewish lexicographers
19th-century American rabbis
19th-century lexicographers